Hirschstein is a municipality in the district of Meißen, in Saxony, Germany.

The following villages belong to Hirschstein: Althirschstein, Bahra, Böhla, Boritz, Heyda, Kobeln, Mehltheuer, Neuhirschstein, Pahrenz, Prausitz and Schänitz.

Leopold III of Belgium and his family were held in Castle Hirschstein from June 1944 to March 1945 by the Nazis.

References 

Meissen (district)